Kiriyama (written: 桐山 lit. "Paulownia tomentosa mountain") is a Japanese surname. Notable people with the surname include:

, Japanese shogi player
, Japanese manga artist
, Japanese actor

Fictional characters
, protagonist of the manga series March Comes in like a Lion
, a character in the light novel series Kokoro Connect
, a character in the novel, manga and film Battle Royale

See also
Kiriyama stable, a defunct stable of sumo wrestlers
Kiriyama Prize, a former international literary award

Japanese-language surnames